Teedyuscung (c. 1700–1763) was known as "King of the Delawares". He worked to establish a permanent Lenape (Delaware) home in eastern Pennsylvania in the Lehigh, Susquehanna, and Delaware River valleys. Teedyuscung participated in the Treaty of Easton, which resulted in the surrender of Lenape claims to all lands in Pennsylvania. Following the treaty, the Lenape were forced to live under the control of the Iroquois in the Wyoming Valley near modern-day Wilkes-Barre. Teedyuscung was murdered by arsonists in the night of April 19, 1763. This marked the beginning of the end of the Lenape presence in Pennsylvania. Teedyuscung's son Chief Bull conducted a raid on the Wyoming Valley that was part of a greater Indian uprising. As a result, the Lenape were forced to move west of the Appalachian Mountains by the Royal Proclamation of 1763.

Early life

Teedyuscung, whose name means "as far as the wood's edge", was born circa 1700 near present-day Trenton, New Jersey. He was raised among a group of Lenape who were acculturated to the ways of the colonists by the time he reached adulthood. Teedyuscung and his family wore European-style clothing and used other European goods in their daily lives. Many of them had converted to Christianity and spoke English. Liquor introduced by traders deeply affected the rest of Teedyuscung's life. The Lenape were driven out of the Trenton area by 1730 and Teedyuscung migrated with his wife and son to a piece of land located near the confluence of the Delaware and Lehigh Rivers in what is now Northampton County, Pennsylvania.

Leadership

After Teedyuscung moved from New Jersey to Pennsylvania, he came in contact with fellow Lenape who had not become accustomed to the ways of the colonial settlers. These Lenape still practiced many of the ceremonies and rituals of their ancestors. Teedyuscung became a spokesman for the Lenape who were forced to negotiate with the government of Colonial Pennsylvania.

The Lenape lost most of the Lehigh Valley following the Walking Purchase of 1737. Teedyuscung remained with his fellow Lenape until 1749 or 1750 when joined the Moravian Church at Lehighton. He did not remain with the Moravians for long. His biographer, Anthony Wallace, wrote,  Teedyuscung left the Moravian settlement in 1754 and settled farther north in the Wyoming Valley. It was while living among other displaced Indians that Teedyuscung would declare himself "King of the Delawares" and assume a vital role in the negotiations between the Natives of Pennsylvania and the colonial government in Philadelphia.

Conflict

Colonists continued to move onto Indian lands throughout eastern Pennsylvania and the Indians of the Wyoming Valley began to fight back. The Lenape in the Wyoming Valley felt pressure from three fronts. From the east came settlers from Connecticut which claimed the Wyoming Valley and all of Northern Pennsylvania. From the west were the French and their Indian allies who sought to prevent British expansion into the mountains of Pennsylvania. And from the south came colonists with land grants from the colonial government in Philadelphia. The Lenape were also under pressure from a severe drought that affected their crops. Teedyuscung had turned to the Pennsylvania colonial government for aid. Pennsylvania referred him to the Iroquois Six Nations government. Neither the Iroquois or Governor Robert Morris were able to provide aid the Lenape, who were attacked by French-allied Native Americans. Ultimately Teedyuscung chose to align his warriors with the western Delaware and French.

Teedyuscung and other leaders commenced periodic raids on colonial settlements in Eastern Pennsylvania. The Natives sought retribution for the series of "purchases" that resulted in massive loss of land to the colonists. Finally Teedyuscung and other leaders met in conferences in Philadelphia and Easton.

At the 1758 negotiations for the Treaty of Easton, Teedyuscung claimed to represent the French allied Delaware Indians and the Six Nations of the Iroquois, the Shawnee, the Mahican, and the Christian Munsee. He sought a promise from the Pennsylvania government that the lands of the Wyoming Valley would be reserved for the displaced Indians of the area. Teedyuscung encountered opposition in the talks at Easton and in later talks with the William Penn's family, and the Iroquois Confederacy that he claimed to "represent" in the negotiations. The powerful Iroquois Confederacy claimed the Wyoming Valley and that the Lenape simply lived there with its permission. A combination of competing interests led to the eventual demise of Teedyuscung and his settlement at Wyolutimunk.

Demise and death

The Iroquois were not pleased that Teedyuscung claimed to negotiate on their behalf and they refused to recognize the Lenape claim to any lands in the Wyoming Valley. The Quaker founders of Pennsylvania were losing control of their colony. As pacifists they did not fight against those who were willing to fight for the colony and settle on lands that the Quakers had promised to the Indians. The Colonies of Virginia and Connecticut settled lands in Pennsylvania that were part of their charters. The competing interests of the Iroquois, Pennsylvania, Connecticut, and Virginia did not allow Teedyuscung and his people to live in the peace that was promised.

Teedyuscung was a casualty of the peace that brought about the end of the French and Indian War in Pennsylvania. The colonists agreed to pull back from settlements in the Ohio country in exchange for peace east of the Appalachians. The Iroquois refused to grant a permanent home for Teedyuscung and his people in the Wyoming Valley. The promised investigation into the Walking Purchase was passed from the colonial government in Philadelphia to the British government in London, where it was eventually dropped. Teedyuscung was left unsupported and unprotected.

On April 19, 1763 his cabin and the village of Wyolutimunk was burned to the ground by arsonists. Teedyuscung was asleep in his cabin at the time and perished in the blaze. The residents of Wyolutimunk fled and settlers from the Susquehanna Company of Connecticut soon took their place. Teedyuscung's dream of a Lenape home in the Wyoming Valley ended with his death.

Wyolutimunk 

Wyolutimunk—also called Kuilutamen, Quilutimunk, and Quelootama— was a village established by Teedyuscung in what is now Wyoming County, Pennsylvania in the Poconos region. The name meant "place of surprise", where a group of Native Americans were once surprised.

The village was burned down on the night of April 19, 1763 when arsons burned down Teedyuscung's cabin, after which the Lenape left the area. The site was next settled in July 1773, by Benjamin Jones, and became the southern part of Falls Township of Wyoming County.

A historical marker, located on Pennsylvania Route 92, across the Susquehanna River from the site, is the place where Teedyuscung met with Christian Frederick Post on May 17, 1760. He was on his way to Tioga, Pennsylvania and the "great concourse in the West.

Legacy

A statue at the Wissahickon Valley Park memorializes Teedyuscung's role as a Native American leader. John Massey Rhind, a Scottish-American sculptor, created the statue for the park. It is located in the northern part of the park.

References

External links
 

Native American leaders
Lenape people
People of colonial Pennsylvania
1700s births
1763 deaths
History of the America (North) Province of the Moravian Church
Native American people from Pennsylvania